The Ministry of Transport and Logistic Services, formerly the Ministry of Transport (MoT) is a government ministry in Saudi Arabia responsible for all aspects of transport, including roads, railways, and ports. Established in 1953, the current minister is Saleh bin Nasser Al-Jasser, who was appointed on 23 October 2019.

History 
In 1953 the ministry was established under the name of the Ministry of Transportation with a task regards supervising the transport aspects. In 1975 the tasks associated with the ministry were extended to including planning, designing, constructing, and maintaining the roads and the bridges. In 2003 the name of the ministry was amended to the Ministry of Transport.

References 

1953 establishments in Saudi Arabia
Transport
Government agencies established in 1953
Saudi